Steven Jolly is an Australian former professional rugby league footballer who played in the 1990s. He played for Parramatta and Balmain in the Australian Rugby League competition. He attended Patrician Brothers' College, Fairfield.

Playing career
Jolly made his first grade debut for Parramatta in round 22 of the 1996 ARL season against Penrith at Penrith Park which ended in a 24–16 loss.

Jolly joined Balmain in 1997 who had just returned to Leichhardt Oval after playing for two seasons at Parramatta Stadium and had dropped the name "Sydney Tigers" after it was deemed a failed experiment.  Jolly scored his only try in the top grade against the Newcastle Knights in round 11 1997.  Jolly made a total of 11 appearances for Balmain as they finished 9th on the table, missing out on the finals by 2 competition points.

References

Year of birth missing (living people)
Place of birth missing (living people)
Living people
Parramatta Eels players
Balmain Tigers players
Rugby league halfbacks
Australian rugby league players